The 1985 Primera División de Fútbol Profesional season 25, 1985.  At the end of the regular season, the top 4 teams took part in the final group stage. 
Atletico Marte, the best regular season team, won the championship match against Alianza, the best team in the final group.

Teams

Managerial changes

During the season

League standings

Final round standings

 Final 
 First leg 

 Second leg 

Top scorers

List of foreign players in the league
This is a list of foreign players in 1985 Seasons. The following players:
have played at least one apetura game for the respective club.
have not been capped for the El Salvador national football team on any level, independently from the birthplaceAtletico Marte  Raul Esnal
  Jose Mario FigueroaC.D. Águila  Alianza F.C.  Óscar Biegler 
  Ruben Alonso
  Carlos Reyes
  Ramón Maradiaga Chalatenango  

 (player released mid season)
  (player Injured mid season)
 Injury replacement playerC.D. FAS  C.D. Luis Ángel Firpo  Salvador FilhoMetapan  Once Lobos  UCA  BobadillaUES'''

External links
 
 

1985
1985–86 in Salvadoran football